Freddie McCoy (November 29, 1932 – September 27, 2009) was an American soul jazz vibraphonist. McCoy started out with Johnny "Hammond" Smith in 1961, and released seven albums for Prestige Records plus one in 1971 for the short-lived Cobblestone Records, before leaving the music industry.

McCoy died in September 2009, at the age of 76.

Discography

As leader
Lonely Avenue (Prestige, 1965)
Spider Man (Prestige, 1965)
Funk Drops (Prestige, 1966)
Peas 'n' Rice (Prestige,1967)
Beans & Greens (Prestige, 1967)
Soul Yogi (Prestige, 1968)
Listen Here (Prestige, 1968)
Gimme Some! (Cobblestone, 1971)

As sideman
With Johnny "Hammond" Smith
Stimulation (Prestige, 1961)
Opus De Funk (Prestige, 1961 [1966])

References

1932 births
2009 deaths
Prestige Records artists
Cobblestone Records artists